The office of Vice-Chancellor of the University of London was created by the Royal Charter of 1836, which founded the university. The role of the vice-chancellorship at the university has varied over the years in light of the successive changes to the constitution of the University of London, and has been greatly influenced by its federal nature. The following is a list of people who have been vice-chancellor of the University of London.

Vice-chancellors

References

Negley Harte, The University of London, 1836–1986: An illustrated history (London and Atlantic Highlands, NJ: The Athlone Press, 1986)
University of London, The historical record (1836–1912) being a supplement to the Calendar completed to September 1912 (London: Hodder & Stoughton, 1912)

 
London
london
London education-related lists